Crassispira pluto is a species of sea snail, a marine gastropod mollusk in the family Pseudomelatomidae.

Description
The length of the shell varies between 14 mm and 20 mm.

Distribution
This marine species occurs in the Sea of Cortez, Western Mexico  down to Panama.

References

 H. A. Pilsbry and H. N. Lowe, West Mexican and Central American Mollusks Collected by H. N. Lowe, 1929-31; Proceedings of the Academy of Natural Sciences of Philadelphia Vol. 84 (1932), pp. 33-144

External links
 
 

pluto
Gastropods described in 1932